Per-Erik Ritzén (born 6 November 1934) is a Swedish modern pentathlete who competed at the 1960 Summer Olympics. He finished 15th individually and sixth with the Swedish team.

References

External links
 

1934 births
Living people
Swedish male modern pentathletes
Olympic modern pentathletes of Sweden
Modern pentathletes at the 1960 Summer Olympics
Sportspeople from Västerbotten County